Francis Tualau (born 23 May 1994) is a Tongan professional rugby league footballer who last played as a  for the Canterbury-Bankstown Bulldogs in the NRL.

Background
Tualau was born in Tofua, Tonga.

He played his junior rugby league for the Mangere East Hawks in New Zealand, and South Eastern Titans in Victoria, Australia, before being signed by the Melbourne Storm.

Playing career

Early career
In 2013 and 2014, Tualau played for the Melbourne Storm's NYC team, before graduating to their Queensland Cup team, Eastern Suburbs Tigers in 2015. In October 2016, he signed a 3-year contract with the Canterbury-Bankstown Bulldogs until the end of 2019.

2017
In round 12 of the 2017 NRL season, Tualau made his NRL debut for the Bulldogs against the Cronulla-Sutherland Sharks.

References

External links
Canterbury Bulldogs profile
Canterbury-Bankstown Bulldogs profile
NRL profile

1994 births
Tongan rugby league players
Canterbury-Bankstown Bulldogs players
Mangere East Hawks players
Eastern Suburbs Tigers players
Rugby league props
Living people
Sunshine Coast Falcons players